The simple station Polo is part of the TransMilenio mass-transit system of Bogotá, Colombia, opened in the year 2000.

Location

The station is located in northwestern Bogotá, specifically on Calle 80, with Carrera 27.

It serves the Juan XXIII, Alcázares Norte, and Santa Sofía neighborhoods.

History

In 2000, phase one of the TransMilenio system was opened between Portal de la 80 and Tercer Milenio, including this station.

The station is named Polo due to its proximity to the neighborhood of the same name located to its north. The neighborhood, in turn, is named for the Polo Club field located within its boundaries.

Station services

Old trunk services

Current Trunk Services

Feeder routes

This station does not have connections to feeder routes.

Inter-city service

This station does not have inter-city service.

External links
TransMilenio

See also
Bogotá
TransMilenio
List of TransMilenio Stations

TransMilenio